A Little Bit of Fluff is a British farce written by Walter W. Ellis which was first staged in 1915 and went on to have a long original run. Starring Ernest Thesiger, it ran at the Criterion Theatre, London, between 1915–1918, for a total of 1241 performances.

Original production
The play opened at the Criterion Theatre on October 27th 1915, with the following cast: 

Ernest Thesiger as Bertrand Tully
George Desmond as John Ayers
Marjorie Maxwell as Pamela 
Ruby Miller as Maimie
Stanley Lathbury as Trippett
Alfred Drayton as Dr. Bigland
Violet Gould as Ursula 
Lilian Talbot as Aunt Hannah
Dulcie Greatwich as Chalmers

Critical reception
Writing of the original production, The Annual Register described the play as "a really first-rate farce", and the performance of Ernest Thesiger (playing the comic hero), as "wonderful".

Other productions
The play, with Stanley Lathbury from the London cast, opened on Broadway in August 1916 at the 39th Street Theatre, but closed after only 17 performances. It was revived in London at the Ambassadors Theatre in 1923, with Thesiger reprising his role as Tully; and at the Ambassadors once more, in 1943.

Adaptations
The play was twice turned into films during the silent era. A 1919 film A Little Bit of Fluff, again with Thesiger, Stanley Lathbury and Alfred Drayton, directed by Kenelm Foss; and the 1928 film A Little Bit of Fluff which featured Betty Balfour, the most popular British actress of the day, and Sydney Chaplin, Charlie Chaplin's elder half-brother.

References

Bibliography
 Low, Rachael. History of the British Film, 1918-1929. George Allen & Unwin, 1971.

External links
 

1915 plays
British plays adapted into films
Plays set in England
Broadway plays
West End plays